Emanuel Richter (born November 29, 1986 in Koper) also known as "Richie", is a Slovenian basketball coach and former professional basketball player. He is currently the Head Coach of the BG Topstar Kangaroos Leitershofen/Stadtbergen (Germany). In his career he played for: KK Luka Koper, KK Portorož, ASD Breg, Vanoli Cremona, Giants Nördlingen and BG Topstar Kangaroos Leitershofen/Stadtbergen.

Emanuel Richter won the 1. Regionalliga South/East Division with the BG Topstar Leitershofen, losing just one game in the whole 2021-22 season. With the title, the team got promoted in the 2. Bundesliga PRO B (Germany).

References

Living people
1986 births
Slovenian basketball players